The men's C-2 slalom canoeing competition at the 2010 Asian Games in Guangzhou was held on 15 and 16 November at the International Rowing Centre.

Schedule
All times are China Standard Time (UTC+08:00)

Results

Heats

Semifinal

Final

References 

Official Website

External links 
Asian Canoe Confederation

Canoeing at the 2010 Asian Games